The 2013 King Cup of Champions, or The Custodian of the Two Holy Mosques Cup, was the 38th season of King Cup of Champions since its establishment in 1957, and the 6th under the current edition. The top eight in the Professional League competed in the King cup which kicked off on 4 May. Al-Ahli were the defending champion but they were eliminated by Al-Shabab in semifinals.

Al-Ittihad won their eighth title after beating Al-Shabab 4–2 in the final, and qualified to the Champions League.

Prize money
 Final winner: 4,000,000 Saudi Riyals.
 Final runners-up: 2,500,000 Saudi Riyals.
 Third place: 1,500,000 Saudi Riyals.

Participating teams

* Number of appearance in King Cup of Champions since the 2008 season.

Fixtures and results

Bracket

Quarter-finals
Quarter-finals were played on 4, 5, 8, & 9 May 2013.

First leg

Second leg

Semi-finals
Semi-finals were played on 17, 18, 24, & 25 May 2013.

First leg

Second leg

Third place
Third place game was played on 28 May 2013.

Final

Winner

References

2013
2012–13 in Saudi Arabian football
2012–13 domestic association football cups